The Opel Rekord Series E is an executive car that replaced the Rekord D on Opel's Rüsselsheim production lines in August 1977, following the end of the summer vacation plant shut-down. It shared its wheelbase and inherited most of its engines from its predecessor, but the bodies were completely new.

In October 1982 the Rekord E was extensively reworked, retaining the central portion of the body, the same windows and the principal elements of the substructure, but with redesigned front and back ends, and with several significant new engines. The pre- and post-facelift versions are commonly referred to as the E1 and E2, respectively.

The Rekord E's nine-year production run was far longer than that of any previous generation of Opel Rekord. It became the third Opel Rekord to exceed a million units produced, but it took longer to reach that target than its predecessor. By now eye watering increases in fuel prices had persuaded many middle market customers to downsize. The Opel Rekord was perceived as a large family car even in its West German home market where, traditionally, family cars were a little larger than in southern Europe.  The Rekord (and later the Omega) would also come under pressure from the entry-level models of German luxury brands such as BMW, Audi and Mercedes-Benz - the beginning of an industry trend which would, by the end of the 1990s, see mass market brands abandon the D/E-segment completely.

The Rekord E was sold in the UK badged as the Vauxhall Carlton, initially identified by a reworked bonnet/hood panel, and after 1982 differentiated by little more than the badges. Despite the UK branding, the Carltons were all produced at Rüsselsheim, leaving Vauxhall's British plants to concentrate on Cavaliers, Chevettes, Vivas and their successors.

The car was developed by Opel and a direct development of a succession of previous Opel Rekords, but during the closing decades of the twentieth century General Motors displayed a growing strategic interest in internationalizing their products, and the underpinnings of the Rekord E became known as the General Motors "V-platform". Cars based on the Rekord E (V-platform) were also built at several General Motors plants outside Europe.

Opel Rekord E1 (1977 - 1982)

The car
Despite sharing its wheelbase and, at least initially, its engine range with the car it replaced, the Opel Rekord E as launched at the 1977 Frankfurt Motor Show was slightly wider, slightly longer, slightly higher and, with larger windows, significantly heavier than the Opel Rekord D. Inside it was noticeably more spacious.

Plaudits for the technologically impressive (though commercially unsuccessful) NSU Ro 80, introduced in 1968, had prompted a revived interest in aerodynamics among West German automakers, and the Rekord E came with claims of an improved drag coefficient of 0.42 Cd.) In 1982 the facelifted "E2" version was released with drag coefficient of 0.36. Of a generally smoother appearance, this version featured redesigned, more aerodynamic front and rear ends, and a reshuffling of engines and equipment levels. The E2 Vauxhall Carltons were distinguishable from Opel Rekords only by their badging, with no sheet metal differences present.

Design

Bodywork

The monocoque steel bodied cars offered seating for five. The top seller was the saloon/sedan. It was available with either two or four doors, although by now the West German market, which had for many years retained an appetite for larger cars with just two doors, was becoming more like the other major automarkets of western Europe in expecting cars the size of the Rekord to provide rear seat passengers with their own doors. The four-door Rekord comfortably outsold its two-door sibling. Saloon production was 769,086 cars, split between 127,544 2-door cars and 641,542 4-door cars. Opel Rekord E1 "Caravan" (estate/station wagon) production was 167,501 cars, of which 26,652 were 3-door models and 140,849 were 5-door ones.

Opel also offered a three-door delivery van combining the driving experience of a car with the load carrying capability of a small commercial vehicle: this was in most respects identical to the station wagon except that the rear side windows were replaced with metal panels. This configuration of vehicles offered self-employed small traders tax advantages in some countries. 30,477 Kasten-Lieferwagen (delivery van) Opel Rekord E1s were produced. This version was also assembled in Indonesia, with either petrol or a diesel 2-liter engines. Built from 1980 until 1988, it was possible to register this as a commercial vehicle although the majority of cars delivered would immediately have rear windows and seats installed.

For the first time since 1961 no Opel Rekord coupé was listed. However, customers wishing to enjoy style at the expense of rear seat headroom had not been abandoned to the competition, having been catered for since September 1970 by the company's stylish new Manta.

Petrol engines 
Opel had introduced a new generation of petrol/gasoline engines in 1966 with the Rekord B and these were the engines that reappeared in the Rekord E in 1977. As before, the stroke length was fixed at 69.8 mm: differences in engine size were achieved by varying the cylinder bore. The engine featured an unusual Camshaft in Head (CIH) configuration. The chain-driven camshaft was positioned directly above the cylinders but this was not a conventional ohc design. The camshaft operated the valves using rocker arms because the camshaft itself was positioned too low above the cylinders to permit direct action from the camshaft on the valves ends. One reason for this may have been cosmetic. Opel's so-called (CIH) engine configuration allowed the Rekord to incorporate the low bonnet/hood lines that style-conscious product development departments called for.

The engine had seen its power output reduced during its time in the previous model following the reduction in standard octanes on West German forecourts in response to reductions in permissible lead levels in motor fuel. This, combined with the increased weight, of the Rekord E to provide rather an underpowered package. The engine presumably cost much the same to produce as similarly configured larger engines and from the point of view of the costing department it no doubt made sense that customers specifying a car with this "1.7N" engine were, according to the manufacturer's price list, charged exactly the same as customer specifying the greater power (and barely enhanced fuel economy) available from the Rekord E when power by the low compression "1.9N" engine. Few Rekord E customers selected the 1.7 litre engine and it disappeared from the list in 1980.

The more popular entry level power unit during the early years of the Rekord E was the 1897 cc 19N engine, also with a low compression ratio and so content to use basic grade low octane petrol/gasoline.

The first of these, known as the "2.0N" came with a low 8:1 compression ratio and used basic grade fuel. The 100 PS unit, the "2.0S", had a 9:1 compression ratio and drivers using this engine were required to pay for "super" grade higher octane fuel. Available from the time of introduction, the new 81 kW "2.0E" engined Rekord also called for higher octane fuel and was the first Opel Rekord to feature fuel injection. This was rendered the more significant because during the 1980s legislators across western Europe would require automakers to fit catalytic converters to petrol/gasoline fueled cars, and these would need to be used in conjunction with fuel injection because of a belief at the time that the imprecision of the fuel amounts injected with traditional carbureters created a risk of unburnt fuel emerging from the engine and burning or exploding in the converter, permanently and expensively damaging it. However, when the Rekord E was introduced in 1977 the challenges of catalytic converters, although already a familiar current challenge for General Motors in North America, were still a few years ahead for the European automakers. The Fuel injection system on the Rekord E came from Bosch who had already acquired extensive expertise of the relevant technologies working with Volkswagen. The system employed on the first fuel injected Rekords was the Bosch L Jetronic system, replaced towards the end of 1981 with the LE Jetronic. Rekord 1981 was also equipped with methanol resistant fuel system.

Diesel engines
The 2068 cc diesel engine with which in 1972 Opel had made their bid for a slice of the lucrative stranglehold that Mercedes-Benz enjoyed over the taxi market reappeared on launch in the Rekord E still offering  of maximum power. However, the new car was heavier than its predecessor and the market had also developed in the intervening half decade. The smaller 2.1 was soon discontinued. As before, the diesel engine was taller than the petrol units designed for the Rekord and diesel powered Rekord Es were differentiated by a long hump shaped ridge along the centre of the bonnet/hood, necessary to accommodate the engine block. Usually equipped with the larger 2.3 litre engine, the diesel Rekords were particularly popular in France, Italy, and the Benelux countries.

By now Ford were also looking for a share of the taxi market with a Peugeot-powered diesel version of their Granada model and Peugeot's own diesel powered 504 was itself becoming an increasingly serious competitor, especially in shared European export markets. The diesel powered Rekord E matched its competitors in many respects and - at least in terms of undiscounted published prices - was generally cheaper than the Mercedes models, but somehow Mercedes-Benz continued to dominate the taxi market in Germany and the surrounding western countries.

For markets - notably Italy but also Belgium - where car tax increased savagely for car with engine capacities above two litres, a reduced diesel engine of 1998 cc with a maximum power output of just  was available. This was the engine more usually specified for diesel powered versions of the smaller, lighter Opel Ascona. Top speed of a 2.0 D with the optional automatic transmission is a leisurely . Rekords with this engine were assembled in Indonesia as well, with three-door panel van or station wagon bodywork.

Transmission
The standard transmission package was a manual all-synchromesh four speed gearbox, controlled using a centrally positioned floor mounted gear lever. There were plans to offer a new five-speed transmission, as in the Opels Senator and Monza, but when, in the summer of 1980, this was still not ready the manufacturer instead offered to buyers of the 1,979 cc petrol/gasoline powered Rekords, for an extra DM 520, the option of a newly developed four-speed manual transmission incorporating an overdrive: this was intended to provide the chance to achieve improved fuel economy at a time when fuel efficiency was moving up the agenda of European car buyers coming to terms with the belief that the "era of cheap fuel" was over for good. Nevertheless, relatively few customers opted for the "four speeds with overdrive" transmission option.

Buyers could also specify a three-speed automatic transmission. The system used was the three-speed TH180 unit from the manufacturer's transmission plant in Strasbourg.

Suspension
At the front the suspension was redesigned, now incorporating MacPherson struts. The result was more compact, lighter, and probably cheaper to assemble than the uneven wishbone arrangements on the previous model, and the car's handling benefitted. Unfortunately Opel approached the Rekord's suspension upgrade "one end at a time", however. At the back the Rekord E retained from the previous model a beam axle tamed with four trailing connector arms, a Panhard rod like system and an anti-roll bar, in combination with coil springs and shock absorbers. Commentators felt that by now the rigid-rear axle based rear suspension fell short of mainstream west European standards in terms of the handling characteristics that it provided. However, customers wishing for more control over the back axle during fast bumpy rides could specify a "sports package" in the Opel Rekord E: the package included replacement of the standard oil-filled shock absorbers at the back of the car by gas-filled shocks. There will no doubt have been a trade-off in terms of a firmer ride in exchange for reduced wallow.

Brakes
The braking configuration was also essentially that from the previous Rekords, with a dual circuit hydraulically controlled system along with the brake servo as before, and incorporating, on larger engined versions, a brake force limiter for the rear brakes. The car used disc brakes at the front and drum brakes at the back.

There was a handbrake control light included in order to discourage drivers from setting off without fully releasing the handbrake.

Trim and equipment packages and special editions
Various different packages of trims and options were offered. These was a "base" Rekord, a luxury version branded as the "Rekord Luxus" and a "Rekord Berlina" which offered a still more opulent level of comfort and equipment. On the outside all cars other than the base version featured a rubber "protection strip" along the side of the car, and further differentiation was apparent from the differing levels of chrome trim and differently shaped steel wheels. On the inside trim qualities and fabrics varied according to version, and the "Berlina" featured a steering wheel with four thin spokes rather than two thick ones. Between 1977 and 1982 the precise details of which items were included in which trim package was periodically modified.

The extensive list of optional extras included a "Sports package" offered on all except the 1.7 litre cars, including various extra dials on the dash-board, halogen head-lights and gas filled shock absorbers for the rear wheels. Customers could also choose from a range of radios and speakers. One of the most eye catching options, featured for the first time on an Opel Rekord, was air conditioning, but for this feature the price was provided only "on application". The very small number of Rekord E1s delivered with air-conditioning suggests that the prices quoted were very high, and that air-conditioning was more a marker for Opel's future than a realistic option for Rekord customers in 1980.

The tactic continued of stimulating sales at quiet times of year by offering special editions - cars equipped with a package of options and advertised at a lower price than the buyer would face if simply equipping a Rekord with the same options from the standard price list. With the Rekord E1 the special editions included the "Rekord Regent", the "Rekord Royale", the "Rekord Classic", the "Rekord Touring" and the "Rekord SR/E".

UK Models

Commercial Success
Overall the Rekord E1 sold at approximately the same rate as its predecessor and in that respect experienced commercial success. Nevertheless, the automarket in West Germany and the surrounding countries had grown substantially in the 1960s and (if somewhat erratically) the 1970s. West Germany remained Europe's largest automarket, and here the latest Rekord did not dominate the market for family cars in the way Rekords had done fifteen years earlier. Data from long-standing rival, Ford Germany, showed the Ford Granada/Consul being produced at a far higher rate than the Rekord, with 1,619,265 cars produced between 1972 - 1977, although these figures did not take into account the large proportion of Granadas sold in the UK, another major European auto-market and one where the Granada inherited the market niche formerly occupied by the home grown Ford Zephyr.

Back in West Germany, Audi now enjoyed the commitment and financial backing of Volkswagen enabling them in due course to expand production at their Ingolstadt facility in response to demand of the Audi 100. Between 1976 and 1982 Audi produced 896,299 Audi 100 models, while between 1977 and 1982 Opel produced 962,218 Opel Rekord E1s. Half a class down Volkswagen's competent and modern Passat captured the mood of the market place, seducing potential Opel customers in a way the K70 had not. Half a class up from the Rekord BMW, close to bankruptcy in the early 1960s, now had the financial muscle to invest in growing production capacity for their 5 series at their own new plant in Dingolfing. The Opel Rekord retained a powerful position in the market place, but that position was increasingly constrained on several fronts. By the time the Rekord E1 was replaced, in 1982, by the extensively upgraded Opel Rekord E2, Opel Rekords were losing market share, and the Rekord E2 would be produced at a significantly lower rate than the Rekord E1.

Technical data

Holden Commodore
The Rekord E1 was the basis of the original 1978 Holden VB Commodore. However, to cope with Australian conditions it was strengthened substantially and used the Senator's nose (like the Opel Commodore) to accommodate the Holden straight-six and V8 engines.

Vauxhall Carlton
The first Vauxhall Carlton was an Opel Rekord E adapted for the United Kingdom market. At the front it featured a different bonnet/hood echoing the "droop-snoot" front, as also used on the Chevette and Cavalier. The Carlton quietly succeeded the (by then long since discontinued) Vauxhall Victor FE, and was joined by the short lived Vauxhall Viceroy, a rebadged Commodore C. In the UK both models were outsold by the Ford Granada. At the back, between the rear light clusters, where the Rekord provided space for the license plate holder, the Carlton was provided with a black panel on which the word "Vauxhall" was spelled out in upper case letters. Carlton owners were expected to mount their rear license plates slightly lower than on the Rekord, screwed directly onto the bumper.

There was only a single trim package offered for the Carlton, corresponding approximately with the "Rekord Berlina", and only one engine could be ordered with the Carlton, being the 1,979 cc 74 kW (100 PS) "2.0S" unit.

The Carlton and the Rekord were assembled on the same production line at the manufacturer's Rüsselsheim plant, and until 1982 right hand drive versions of both cars competed together in the UK market. Buyers attracted by the Carlton but looking for a trim and engine combination not featured on the Vauxhall could accordingly choose a car from the Opel Rekord range. From 1982, the facelifted E2 Vauxhall Carltons were distinguishable from Opel Rekords only by their badging, with no sheet metal differences.

Chevrolet Rekord
The Rekord E1 was sold in South Africa where initially it was branded as the Chevrolet Rekord, with either the four-door sedan or the five-door wagon bodywork. It was first announced in early July 1978, in standard or GL versions. The Rekord was soon followed by the more luxurious Chevrolet Commodore, with which it shared most of its bodywork.

Import duties in South Africa were prohibitively high, but anticipated volumes did not justify a car plant. The cars were therefore delivered as kits and then assembled at Port Elizabeth. Local modifications, aside from the engine, included particular attention to dust protection. After the fall of 1980 the Chevrolet Rekord was also available with the 1,979 cc four as used in Europe, with 100 PS (74 kW).

Saehan Rekord
The Saehan Rekord and Saehan Royale were Korean built versions of the Opel Rekord E1. The General Motors company which assembled them later became known as Daewoo and the car became known as the Daewoo Royale and continued to be based on the Rekord E1 till 1985, by which time Rüsselsheim had been producing the upgraded Rekord E2 for more than two years.

The Korean cars came with a choice of 3 Camshaft in Head (CIH) engines, all of them delivered from Germany by Opel. The petrol/gasoline engine sizes were 1,492 cc, 1,897 cc, and 1,979 cc, and the maximum power outputs were respectively 60, 85 and 102 PS. All three engines were broadly similar and they shared the same 69.8 mm piston stroke, with the variation in overall displacement achieved by varying the cylinder bore, although the smallest of them had not been fitted to a German assembled Opel Rekord since being phased out in 1970 during the time of the Opel Rekord C. From May 1980 the Korean car was also available with a 1,998 cc diesel unit. This was the same unit as used in Europe to power diesel Rekords in markets such as Italy with taxation regimes that punished cars with engines of above two litres capacity. Claimed top speed with this diesel unit was just 130 km/h (81 mph).

Despite using European engines, the Korean petrol/gasoline fueled cars rejected the German cars' Solex carbureters, using Nikki-Stromberg ones instead. Body panel pressings came not from Europe but from Holden in Australia who were producing their own Rekord derived model, although the Australian car was closer to the slightly longer Opel Senator, itself a lengthened version of the Rekord E.

Opel Rekord E2 (1982 - 1986) 

In September 1982 the Rekord E received a major upgrade. The upgrade might have been held out as marking a new Opel Rekord, but it was not: the manufacturer continued to use the "Rekord E" designation. Subsequently, Rekords assembled in Rüsselsheim between 1977 and 1982 have become known as Rekord E1s, and those assembled in that plant between 1982 and 1986 have become known as Rekord E2s. However, in other continents where the Rekord was assembled, the Rekord E2 replaced the Rekord E1 later than in Europe. The E2 also marked the end of Carlton production at Vauxhall's Luton plant - with the Vauxhall brand dropped in all GM Europe markets outside the UK, all Vauxhall Carlton-badged Rekord E2s were now also assembled at Rüsselsheim. This would continue for the next two generations of Opel Omega which followed.

The new car shared the basic chassis components from the E1. The shape of the central portion of the car was unchanged. But there were several new engines, and the front hood was reshaped to give a smoother profile. The apparently minor changes in the shapes of the ends of the car, together with tighter tolerances applied to major pressings which permitted a reduction in the panel gaps on the car body, enabled the manufacturer to boast of an improved aerodynamic profile which marginally improved performance and reduced fuel consumption. The published drag coefficient was reduced from 0.42 Cd on the Rekord E1 to 0.36 Cd on the Rekord E2. The Opel Rekord D had been seen by many enthusiasts as a good looking car: the styling of the E1 had met with a more mixed reception. Opel now used the extra length at the car's ends to produce a Rekord E2 with more conventionally mainstream proportions than those of the short-nosed E1.

The Rekord E was initially available in three equipment levels: standard, De Luxe, and Berlina. In March 1983 the luxurious CD model appeared, plugging the small gap left by the disappearance of the Commodore. For the light 1985 model year facelift (introduced in July 1984) the names of the equipments changed: the standard became the LS, the De Luxe became the GL, and the Berlina was now the GLS. The CD remained.

Design

Bodywork
The monocoque steel bodied cars offered seating for five. Ten years earlier the Opel Rekord had come with a wide choice of body types, but coupé and coach-built cabriolet had already gone, and with the 1982 introduction of the Rekord E2 the manufacturer also withdrew the two door saloon/sedan. This left just a choice between a four-door saloon/sedan and a three- or five-door estate/station wagon. A delivery van version of the Rekord E2 remained in production, but only 8,958 of these were produced between 1982 and 1986 as against 30,477 Rekord E1 based vans produced between 1977 and 1982.

Despite the wheelbase being unchanged, the overhangs had increased, and the Rekord E2, yet again, was a little longer than the car it replaced. In fact it was exactly the same length as the recently upgraded but rather more prestigious BMW 5-series.

Petrol engines
With the arrival of the E2, the low compression "1.7N", "1.9N" and "2.0N" engines disappeared from the Rekord, to be replaced by engines from a new range that had first appeared in 1981, albeit in 1.6 litre format on the Ascona C and Kadett D models. Featuring a light metal cylinder head and a conventional overhead camshaft this unit presumably had fewer moving parts in the valvegear than the more singular Camshaft in Head (CIH) unit that had powered Opel Rekords since 1965. For the Rekord E2 a 1796 cc version of the engine was fitted. This 1.8 litre engine, in its 66 kW (90 PS) version had in fact already become available a few months earlier in the Opel Manta. In this format, the "1.8S" engine employed a single twin chamber carbureter and, with a compression ratio of 9.2:1, required higher octane "super" grade fuel. For economy minded customers an entry level version of the 1796 cc engine was offered with a more basic carbureter and compression ratio of 8.2:1. In this configuration the "1.8N" engine provided a claimed maximum power output of 55 kW (75 PS), slightly less performance and slightly better fuel economy. However, at least in the manufacturer's own advertised prices, the "1.8S" and "1.8N" engined cars were sold at the same price.

As a subsidiary of a corporation headquartered in the US, Opel had more reason than most European automakers to access and understand the increasingly stringent anti-pollution regulations which had effectively enforced the fitting of catalytic converters to cars sold in the US, and now the trend was spreading across the Atlantic. By the time the Rekord E2 appeared in 1982 West Germany had already passed the law that would effectively enforce the use of catalytic converters for cars sold there, though at this stage the industry was still being given time, in West Germany, to prepare for the new laws to come into force: Switzerland and Sweden had already introduced much more stringent standards than other European nations, and catalytic converters began making inroads in the mid-80s. It was still believed that carburettor fed engines were liable to pass unburnt fuel into the exhaust chamber, with potentially damaging results for the converter, so the manufacturer chose to combine the new anti-pollution device with a potentially more precise fuel injection system. Beginning in August of 1985 the Rekord became available in its West German home market with a third version of the 1796 cc engine, designated the "1.8 i Kat". As the designation indicated, this engine came with fuel injection and a catalytic converter. A maximum 74 kW (100 PS) of power was claimed, and the performance was accordingly enhanced, but the Opel Rekord 1.8 with this engine required "super" grade fuel which it consumed with indelicate relish. Nevertheless, it was one of the first cars to be offered in West Germany with this level of pollution control.

In contrast to the smaller engined cars, for larger engined petrol/gasoline powered Rekord E2s the 1979 cc Camshaft in Head (CIH) engine was carried forward from the previous model. The "2.0S" version delivered 74 kW (100 PS) as before, though now with a higher compression ratio, the Varajet 2 carburettor and the requirement for "super" grade higher octane fuel. The "2.0E" version continued, at launch, as the only Rekord to incorporate fuel injection and in this form it provided maximum power output of 81 kW (110 PS). In 1984 a larger 2197 cc version of the fuel injected four cylinder "2.2E" engine was introduced, differing from the "2.0" only because the piston stroke was now extended from 69.8 mm to 77.5 mm. The new car was noted at the time for its unusually strong torque, even at low engine speeds. In West Germany the "2.2E" powered Rekord E replaced the "2.0E" car, but in export markets where the two litre threshold was more significant in terms of punitive car tax rates the "2.0E" engined car continued to be listed. The Rekord's largest export market to retain the "2.0E" engine for tax reasons was, as previously, Italy, but the "2.0E" continued to be sold in place of the "2.2E" in Switzerland and Sweden because the larger engined car was initially unable to meet the new anti-pollution requirements in those countries.

Diesel engines
However, a year later, in Autumn 1983, power was increased to  along with a small increase in torque. At the Geneva Motor Show in March 1984, a turbocharged version of the venerable 2.3 litre diesel was introduced, going on sale a few months later. This was Opel's first turbocharged engine. Other mechanic differences were slim, limited to better cooling measures (including an oil cooler) and other detail measures. The turbodiesel, only available with a five-speed manual, was also offered in the luxurious "CD" trim. This engine had already been offered in a diesel powered version of the longer Opel Senator since 1983.

Transmission & Suspension
The standard transmission package was the manual all-synchromesh four-speed gearbox, controlled using a floor mounted gear change. There was also the option of a Getrag-manufactured five-speed transmission. This became available in 1982, a couple of years later than had been planned. Buyers of all but the smallest engined cars could also still specify a three-speed automatic transmission option. The five-speed had longer gearing than the fourth speed on the first three gears, while fourth remained mostly the same and fifth was an overdrive. This was then compensated for by a longer final drive for the five-speed, although the 1.8 S, which has a lot of low-end torque while being somewhat unwilling to rev, received the same final drive as the four-speed, for an even greater gas mileage improvement.

At the rear, a live axle retained by a panhard rod was employed with an open differential. Differential bushings were added after E2 production had started. Up front, the MacPherson strut layout from the E1 was modified to be more supple. The front stabilizer bar no longer acted as the torque arm; instead, it was attached to the lower A-arm of the front suspension. The springs were changed to variable rate units, allowing for a softer ride with less body roll when driven hard. Steering was by a steering box and drag links. The brakes received somewhat larger pistons for the front discs (drums at the rear), otherwise they remained unchanged.

Commercial
Approximately 1.4 million Rekord Es were produced, which made it the third Rekord in succession to sell above a million cars. However, 962,218 were Rekord E1s produced between 1977 and 1982, meaning that after 1982 the Rekord E2 was selling at less than 60% of the annualised rate of the E1. In part it was a victim of the success of the company's own Ascona which pushed the Rekord upmarket, but as it moved upmarket it moved ever closer to the prestige models being sold in ever higher volumes. Although the advertised prices - at least to private buyers - for cars such as the Mercedes-Benz W123, the 5 series BMW and the Audi 100 - were considerably higher than those for the Rekord, the gap was smaller than it had been and, increasingly, customers paying for a car this size were willing to pay for the prestige brands. The higher purchase prices of the upscale brands were also mitigated by a higher value retention. Opel were not alone in having their largest family cars squeezed out by the prestige brands, and the Peugeot 604, Renault 20/30 and Ford Granada along with their increasingly marginalised successors all fell victim to the same phenomenon during the closing decades of the twentieth century, while mainstream volume automakers outside Europe sought to address the same issues by launching, with varying degrees of success, new premium brands such as Lexus, Infiniti and Eunos.

For the time being Opel persisted with the large family car segment, and at the end of the summer in 1986 the Rekord was replaced on the Rüsselsheim production lines by the more aerodynamic yet Opel Omega.

Technical data

Vauxhall Carlton
When the Rekord E2 replaced the Rekord E1, the Vauxhall Carlton version also received a facelift. In this case, the car lost its distinctive hood/bonnet at the front and became, in most respects, indistinguishable from the Rekord. Whereas the first generation of Carlton had been offered with a single engine and a single trim package, the 1982 Carlton was available with several of the engines from the Rekord's palette, as well as several of the Rekord's trim options. General Motors in Europe now followed the logic arising from the end of separately designed Vauxhalls, and after 1982 there were no more Opel Rekord badged cars exported to the UK. Right hand drive Rekords continued to be produced at Rüsselsheim for certain right hand drive markets - notably Ireland - where the Opel name plate was thought to enjoy wider customer acceptance than the Vauxhall one.

Opel Rekord in South Africa
In South Africa the Opel Rekord switched from the E1 to the E2 version only in 1984, General Motors's South African subsidiary having changed from the Chevrolet brand name two years earlier. It continued to be assembled in South Africa until the early 1990s, long after the German model itself had been replaced. The 2.0 engine was joined in 1984 by the "2.2E" engines.

From mid-1991 the cars became available with a 3.8 litre V6 engine with  originating with General Motors' Holden subsidiary in South Australia. This largely replaced the earlier Commodore, which, unlike its German counterparts had continued to be available after the mid-life facelift. The Commodore was only available with the fuel injected 30E engine. On the other hand, the CD reached  faster, as a result of being able to reach the ton in second gear. In addition to a full equipment (slightly less ample for the sportier GSi), the Rekord 380i also received the Omega's independent rear suspension and power assisted rack-and-pinion steering to help handle the extra power. The interior was upgraded with a new dash and a sporty steering wheels and seats, while the exterior received ten-spoke alloy wheels and a rear spoiler.

Until 1986 the Opel Rekord was assembled by General Motors South Africa in Port Elizabeth, but as a result of an international sanctions regime General Motors were not permitted to invest further after 1986. The business was transferred through a management buy-out to a new company called the Delta Motor Corporation, and it was under this arrangement that Rekord E2s were assembled in South Africa until the 1990s, using kits shipped from Rüsselsheim. In another minor facelift, the later South African Rekords featured the Opel badge mounted above rather than within the grille, similar to the smaller Kadetts of the era.

Saehan / Daewoo Royale
At the end of 1984 the Rekord E2 became the basis for the Korean assembled Saehan Royale, which until then had continued to be based on the Rekord E1. The engines remained, as before, the Rekord's 1492 cc, 1897 cc and 1979 cc units.

Until 1983 the Korean cars had been branded as Saehan Rekords and Saehan Royales, but after that date the Rekord name was dropped and they were all branded as Royales. Some time later, reflecting a change in the corporate structure, the "Saehan" name was replaced by "Daewoo". Around this time the rear end design was changed for one similar to that of an early Senator. Later in the 1980s body panels shipped in from Holden's South Australian factory were replaced by local stampings, and in 1987 the front and rear panels of the car were reshaped and modernized. In other respects the car remained true to its Opel Rekord origins and it continued in Korean production until 1990.

See also 
 Opel Rekord
 Opel Commodore
 Daewoo Royale

References

External links 

 Infoseite Opel Rekord E1
 Infoseite Opel Rekord E2

Rekord E
Sedans
Station wagons
Executive cars
Rear-wheel-drive vehicles
Cars introduced in 1977
1980s cars